Hydaranthes is a genus of moths belonging to the subfamily Tortricinae of the family Tortricidae.

Species
Hydaranthes deltographa Meyrick, 1928

See also
List of Tortricidae genera

References

External links
tortricidae.com

Tortricinae
Tortricidae genera